Chuzi (389 BC or 388–385 BC) was from 386 BC to 385 BC the 28th ruler of the Zhou Dynasty Chinese state of Qin that eventually united China to become the Qin Dynasty.  His ancestral name was Ying (嬴), and Chuzi was his posthumous name.  He was the second of two child rulers of Qin called Chuzi.  He is also variously referred to as Duke Chu of Qin (秦出公), Shaozhu of Qin (秦少主), or Xiaozhu of Qin (秦小主) (Shaozhu and Xiaozhu both mean "Young Lord").

Chuzi was the grandson of Duke Jian of Qin, who was the uncle of his predecessor Duke Ling.  When Duke Ling died in 415 BC, the throne passed to his uncle Duke Jian instead of to his son, the later Duke Xian.  Duke Jian reigned for 15 years and was succeeded by his son, Chuzi's father Duke Hui II, who reigned for 13 years and died in 387 BC.  When Chuzi succeeded his father as ruler of Qin he was either one or two years old, and the state of Qin was effectively controlled by his mother, the duchess dowager Qin Xiaozhu.  Just two years later, in 385 BC a minister in the government, Jun Gai (菌改), rebelled against Chuzi and the duchess.  He led his forces to escort Duke Xian, who was at the time exiled in the State of Wei, back to Qin, killed Chuzi and his mother and installed Duke Xian on the throne.  Chuzi was just three or four years old when he died.

References

Rulers of Qin
4th-century BC Chinese monarchs
385 BC deaths
4th-century BC murdered monarchs
Assassinated Chinese politicians
Child monarchs from Asia
Year of birth unknown